The 2013 Bank of the West Classic was a professional tennis tournament played on hard courts. It was the 42nd edition of the tournament, which was part of the WTA Premier tournaments of the 2013 WTA Tour. It took place in Stanford, California, United States between 22 and 28 July 2013. It was the first event on the 2013 US Open Series.

Singles main-draw entrants

Seeds

 1 Rankings are as of July 15, 2013

Other entrants
The following players received wildcards into the singles main draw:
  Nicole Gibbs
  Ajla Tomljanović

The following players received entry from the qualifying draw:
  Vera Dushevina
  Alla Kudryavtseva
  Michelle Larcher de Brito
  CoCo Vandeweghe

Withdrawals
Before the tournament
  Marion Bartoli (hamstring strain)
  Kirsten Flipkens
  Sabine Lisicki (wrist injury)
  Maria Sharapova (hip injury)

Retirements
  Alla Kudryavtseva (heat illness)

Doubles main-draw entrants

Seeds

1 Rankings are as of July 15, 2013

Other entrants
The following pair received a wildcard into the doubles main draw:
  Nicole Gibbs /  CoCo Vandeweghe

Withdrawals
During the tournament
  Francesca Schiavone (viral illness)

Finals

Singles

  Dominika Cibulková defeated  Agnieszka Radwańska, 3–6, 6–4, 6–4

Doubles

  Raquel Kops-Jones /  Abigail Spears defeated  Julia Görges /  Darija Jurak, 6–2, 7–6(7–4)

References

External links
Official website

Bank of the West Classic
Silicon Valley Classic
Sports in Stanford, California
Bank of the West Classic